The EuroPowerPack is the combination of the MTU MT883 Ka-500/501 diesel engine delivering over 1100 kW (1500 PS) shaft power with the ten-speed (five forward, five reverse) Renk HSWL 295TM automatic transmission for the use in heavy tracked vehicles like tanks.

This very compact power pack delivers as much or more power than the most powerful tank engines currently in service, but offers increased fuel efficiency and requires less space.

Engine specifications

 Engine: MTU MT883 Ka-500/501 27.4-litre (27,361 cc) 90° V-block 12-cylinder liquid-cooled diesel engine
 Bore x stroke: 144 mm x 140 mm (5.669 inches X 5.512 inches)
 Aspiration: 2x single-stage turbocharged & air-to-liquid intercooled (charged-air cooler)
 Fuel system: Mechanical fuel line pump or Common rail (Ka-500)/Common rail (Ka-501)
 Coolant capacity: 110 L (29.05 gal)
 Lubrication: Dry sump
 Lubricant capacity: 80 L (21.13 gal)
 Engine length: 1,488 mm (58.583 inches)
 Engine width: 972 mm (38.268 inches)
 Engine height: 742 mm (29.213 inches)
 Dry weight (estimated): 1,800 kg (3,968 lbs)
 Power: 1,500 hp (Ka-500)/1,630 hp (Ka-501) @ 2,700 rpm Rated 1min
 Torque: 3,352 lb·ft (4545Nm)(Ka-500)/3,687 lb·ft (4999Nm)(Ka-501) @ 2,000 rpm

Transmission specifications

 Transmission: RENK HSWL 295TM - Ten Speed (Five Forward, Five Reverse)
 Transmission length: 774 mm (30.472 inches)
 Transmission width: 1,660 mm (65.354 inches)
 Transmission height: 816 mm (32.126 inches)
 Dry weight: 2,400 kg (5,286 lbs)
 Maximum Power: 1,600 hp

Uses 

The EuroPowerPack is used in:

 Leclerc tropicalisé
 Challenger 2E
 Merkava Mk. 4
 Arjun: Uses the same engine as in EuroPowerPack but with a different semi-automatic Renk RK 304-I transmission
 K2 Black Panther: Euro power packs (MT883 Ka-500) were used in 100 tanks produced for the first batch.

References

Tank engines